Play is Australian/British classical-electropop band Bond's fourth studio album. It was released on 26 June 2011. The album's release was revealed in an interview with Tania Davis in the Birmingham Mail, in which Davis stated that the band were then currently working on their next studio album. She also noted that the album would have gypsy, folk and Eastern European influences. In late 2010, the band were performing material from their new album Play at concerts in Mexico, including the single "Diablo".

The album was released in Mexico in June 2011 before being released in Korea in August 2011 and Japan in late September 2011. It was released on 13 January 2012 in Australia, and charted at #94 on the albums chart, and in the US on August 7, 2012.

Songs on the album include their first single "Diablo". The string quartet also showcases "Jai Ho", a huge hit from the movie Slumdog Millionaire. The album also features a few more recognizable hits. The song "Pump It" is a version of the song popularised by The Black Eyed Peas, which samples the Dick Dale and the Del-Tones' hit song "Misirlou", featured in the opening credits of Pulp Fiction. The song "Last Time" is an interpretation of "The Last Time" by The Rolling Stones, heavily sampled in "Bitter Sweet Symphony" by the band The Verve, per the alternate naming of the song.

Track listing

Release history

References

Bond (band) albums
Universal Music Group albums
2011 albums